Mastax extrema is a species of beetle in the family Carabidae found in Namibia and South Africa.

References

Mastax extrema
Beetles of Africa
Beetles described in 1896